Albert Walker McAndrew (1920–2009) was an Australian rugby league player who played in the 1930s and 1940s. He was a state representative half-back who won the 1941 premiership with St George.

Playing career
"Albie" McAndrew was still seventeen when he debuted in first-grade for St George in 1938. He played eight seasons with  St George between 1938 and 1945. 

He was a member of the first St. George side to win a premiership in 1941. He represented New South Wales in 1940, and played for NSW City Firsts in 1940 and 1943. 

His representative career was interrupted by World War II when, in 1942, he enlisted in the 54th Australian Anti-Aircraft Regiment with the rank Bombardier.

Death
McAndrew died on 9 December 2009, aged 89.

Published sources
 Whiticker, Alan & Hudson, Glen (2006) The Encyclopedia of Rugby League Players, Gavin Allen Publishing, Sydney
 Haddan, Steve (2007) The Finals - 100 Years of National Rugby League Finals, Steve Haddan Publishing, Brisbane

References

1920 births
2009 deaths
Australian Army personnel of World War II
Australian rugby league players
City New South Wales rugby league team players
New South Wales rugby league team players
Rugby league halfbacks
St. George Dragons players